Her Only Way is a 1918 silent film drama directed by Sidney Franklin with Norma Talmadge as the star.

Cast
Norma Talmadge - Lucille Westbrook
Eugene O'Brien - Joseph Marshall
Ramsey Wallace - Paul Belmont
E. Alyn Warren - Judge Hampton Bates
Jobyna Howland - Mrs. Randolph

Preservation status
The film is currently lost.

References

External links
 Her Only Way at IMDb.com

lantern slide(Wayback Machine)

1918 films
American silent feature films
American black-and-white films
Lost American films
Films directed by Sidney Franklin
Silent American drama films
1918 drama films
Selznick Pictures films
Lost drama films
1918 lost films
1910s American films